The economy of Slovenia is a developed economy, and the country enjoys a high level of prosperity and stability as well as above-average GDP per capita by purchasing power parity at 83% of the EU28 average in 2015. The nominal GDP in 2022 is 62.191 billion USD, nominal GDP per capita (GDP/pc) in 2022 is USD 29,469. The highest GDP/pc is in central Slovenia, where the capital city Ljubljana is located. It is part of the Western Slovenia statistical region, which has a higher GDP/pc than eastern Slovenia.

In January 2007,  Slovenia became the first member to have both joined the European Union and adopted the euro since the currency's creation in 1999. It has also been a member of the Organisation for Economic Co-operation and Development since 2010.

Slovenia has a highly educated workforce, well-developed infrastructure, and is situated at a major transport crossroads. The level of foreign direct investment is one of the lowest but has been steadily rising in the last few years. The Slovenian economy has been affected by the European economic crisis, which occurred in the late 2000s. After 2013, GDP per capita began rising again. Almost two-thirds of the working population is employed in services.

History
Although it comprised only about one-eleventh of Yugoslavia's total population, it was the most productive of the Yugoslav republics, accounting for one-fifth of its GDP and one-third of its exports.
Slovenia thus gained independence in 1991 with an already relatively prosperous economy and strong market ties to the West.

Since that time it has vigorously pursued diversification of its trade with the West and integration into Western and transatlantic institutions. Slovenia is a founding member of the World Trade Organization, joined CEFTA in 1996, and joined the European Union on 1 May 2004. In June 2004 it joined the European Exchange Rate Mechanism. The euro was introduced at the beginning of 2007 and circulated alongside the tolar until 14 January 2007. Slovenia also participates in SECI (Southeast European Cooperation Initiative), as well as in the Central European Initiative, the Royaumont Process, and the Black Sea Economic Council.

In the late 2000s economic crisis, the Slovenian economy suffered a severe setback. In 2009 the Slovenian GDP per capita shrank by −7.9%. After a slow recovery from the 2009 recession, thanks to exports, the economy of Slovenia again slid into recession in the last quarter of 2011. This has been attributed to the fall in domestic consumption and the slowdown in the growth of exports. Slovenia mainly exports to countries of the eurozone. The reasons for the decrease in domestic consumption have been multiple: fiscal austerity, the freeze on budget expenditure in the final months of 2011, a failure in the efforts to implement economic reforms, inappropriate financing, and the decrease in exports. In addition, the construction industry was severely hit in 2010 and 2011. From 2014 onwards GDP of Slovenia is rising again. The main factors of GDP growth are export and in the year 2016 also domestic consumption, which started to revive after the economic crisis. The GDP growth in 2015 was 2,3%, in the first half of 2016  2,5%, and in the 2nd quarter of 2016 2,7%. It means that GDP growth is accelerating in 2016.

During the EU accession negotiations, Slovenia insisted on numerous derogations, refusing to open up certain key sectors of the economy to full competition. The country is the only one in Central and Eastern Europe to have retained control of its banking sector. The country has also preserved an important public service built during the socialist period; Slovenia still has one of the best healthcare systems in the world, and education is free up to the postgraduate level.

Trade
Slovenia's trade is orientated towards other EU countries, mainly Germany and Italy. This is the result of a wholesale reorientation of trade toward the West and the growing markets of central and eastern Europe in the face of the collapse of its Yugoslav markets. Slovenia's economy is highly dependent on foreign trade. Trade equals about 120% of GDP (exports and imports combined). About two-thirds of Slovenia's trade is with other EU members.

This high level of openness makes it extremely sensitive to economic conditions in its main trading partners and changes in its international price competitiveness. However, despite the economic slowdown in Europe in 2001–03, Slovenia maintained a 3% GDP growth. Keeping labour costs in line with productivity is thus a key challenge for Slovenia's economic well-being, and Slovenian firms have responded by specializing in mid- to high-tech manufacturing. Industry and construction comprise about one-quarter of the GDP. As in most industrial economies, services make up an increasing share of output (57.1 percent), notably in financial services.

Agriculture

Slovenia produced in 2018:

  of maize;
  of grape;
  of wheat;
  of barley;
  of apple;
  of potato;

In addition to smaller productions of other agricultural products. 

Neonicotinoids are commonly used as they are throughout the world, including the use of thiacloprid in the country's apple orchards. Smodiš Škerl et al 2009 find thiacloprid/apple application practices leave a residue in the pollen but not in bee bread.

Economic performance
The traditional primary industries of agriculture, forestry, and fishing comprise a comparatively low 2.5 percent of GDP and engage only 6 percent of the population. The average farm is only 5.5 hectares. Part of Slovenia lies in the Alpe-Adria bioregion, which is currently involved in a major initiative in organic farming. Between 1998 and 2003, the organic sector grew from less than 0.1% of Slovenian agriculture to roughly the European Union average of 3.3%.

Public finances have shown a deficit in recent years. This averaged around $650 million per annum between 1999 and 2007, however, this amounted to less than 23 percent of GDP. There was a slight surplus in 2008 with revenues totalling $23.16 billion and expenditures $22.93 billion. Government expenditure equalled 38 percent of GDP. , the total national debt of Slovenia was unknown. The Statistical Office of the Republic of Slovenia (SURS) reported it to be (not counting state-guaranteed loans) 19.5 billion euros or 54.2% of GDP at the end of September 2010. According to the data provided by the Slovenian Ministry of Finance in January 2011, it was just below 15 billion euros or 41.6% of the 2009 GDP. However, the Slovenian financial newspaper Finance calculated in January 2011 that it is actually 22.4 billion euros or almost 63% of GDP, surpassing the limit of 60% allowed by the European Union. On 12 January 2011, the Slovenian Court of Audit rejected the data reported by the ministry as incorrect and demanded the dismissal of the finance minister Franc Križanič.

Slovenia's traditional anti-inflation policy relied heavily on capital inflow restrictions. Its privatization process favoured insider purchasers and prescribed a long lag time on share trading, complicated by a cultural wariness of being "bought up" by foreigners. As such, Slovenia has had a number of impediments to foreign participation in its economy. Slovenia has garnered some notable foreign investments, including the investment of $125 million by Goodyear in 1997. At the end of 2008, there was around $11.5 billion of foreign capital in Slovenia. Slovenians had invested $7.5 billion abroad. As of 31 December 2007, the value of shares listed on the Ljubljana Stock Exchange was $29 billion.

Investments from neighboring Croatia have begun in Slovenia. On 1 July 2010, Droga Kolinska was purchased by the Atlantic Group of Croatia for 382 million euros. Mercator was sold to Croatia's Agrocor in June 2014.

At the end of the year 2014, there were 10 billion foreign direct investment in Slovenia, 13,9% more than at the end of the year 2013. In 2013 (latest published data) direct foreign investments accounted for 24.7% of the GDP of Slovenia. The most important investor countries are Austria (33.6%), Switzerland (11.3%), Germany (10.4%), Italy (7.9%), and Croatia (7.7%).

The following table shows the main economic indicators from 1993–2017.

See also
List of banks in Slovenia
List of companies of Slovenia

References

 
Slovenia
Slovenia
Slovenia